Cisze  is a village in the administrative district of Gmina Chodzież, within Chodzież County, Greater Poland Voivodeship, in west-central Poland.

The village had a population of 15 as of 2008.

References

Cisze